Éli Verges Napoles Kroupi Zahi (born 18 October 1979), simply known as Élie Kroupi, is a former Ivorian footballer who played as a forward. He played for, among others, Rennes, Valence, Lorient, Angers and Al-Wahda FC.

Career
Kroupi was born in Sassandra, Ivory Coast.

Whilst at Lorient, Kroupi played in the 2002 Coupe de France Final, in which they beat SC Bastia.

He spent the 2006–07 season on loan at United Arab Emirates side Al-Wahda FC. In July 2007, it was announced that Kroupi would not return to AS Nancy, after the club decided to cancel his contract. Then, Kroupi signed with Greek club Levadiakos F.C. in 2008. After 8 appearances for Levadiakos, he returned to France. This time, he signed with Nîmes Olympique in Ligue 2. On 18 March 2010, Al Urooba signed the Ivorian striker from Nîmes.

Playing style
Kroupi is known for his speed, his ability to shoot accurately with both feet, and his supreme scoring ability. He was also one of the top scorers in Ligue 1 during the 2005–06 season.

Personal life
Kroupi holds a French passport. His cousin is Cleveland City Stars player Arsène Oka.

References

1979 births
Living people
People from Bas-Sassandra District
Ivorian footballers
Ivory Coast international footballers
Association football forwards
Stade Rennais F.C. players
ASOA Valence players
Ivorian expatriate sportspeople in Italy
FC Lorient players
Ivorian expatriate sportspeople in France
Angers SCO players
Ivorian expatriate sportspeople in Greece
AS Nancy Lorraine players
Expatriate footballers in Greece
S.S. Arezzo players
Expatriate footballers in France
Al Wahda FC players
Levadiakos F.C. players
Nîmes Olympique players
Al Urooba Club players
Ligue 1 players
Ligue 2 players
Super League Greece players
Expatriate footballers in Italy
Ivorian expatriate footballers
Ivorian expatriate sportspeople in the United Arab Emirates
Expatriate footballers in the United Arab Emirates
UAE First Division League players
UAE Pro League players